Flickerpix is a multi-media animation company based in Holywood, Northern Ireland. Currently led by Creative Director Johnny Schumann, Flickerpix have produced a wide range of projects including On The Air; a mix of stop motion and 2D animation based on the Gerry Anderson (broadcaster) BBC Radio Ulster show. They have also produced the BBC Northern Ireland series Five Fables; an adaptation of Seamus Heaney's translation of five medieval Scots fables. This was narrated by acclaimed comedian/ actor Billy Connolly and scored by Belfast-born pianist Barry Douglas. Their collaboration with CBBC Newsround for the special Living with Alcohol went on to be awarded a BAFTA.

History 
Flickerpix was established in 2003 and began by producing animated stings for local TV station UTV in East Belfast.

Within the first two years of their founding, Flickerpix produced their first animated short film Horn OK Please which depicts a day in the life of a Bombay taxi driver. It combined a mixture of stop motion animation and 3D backgrounds. This went on to win over 16 international awards.

In 2006, Flickerpix created the animated TV series On The Air for BBC Northern Ireland which was based on BBC Radio Ulster The Gerry Anderson Show. Due to the success of the first series, the show was made into a total of four seasons and went on to win the Royal Television Society NI Comedy and Entertainment Award in 2015.

In 2008, Flickerpix became part of Waddell Media, one of Ireland’s largest and most successful independent production companies, and moved to the seaside village of Holywood, Northern Ireland.

Following this, Flickerpix went on to create television series Days Like This and Wee Wise Words. They also produced over 7 minutes of specially commissioned animation for the 14 minute documentary Living with Alcohol, broadcast during the World Cup season on CBBC. In 2010, the documentary won the BAFTA for best Children’s Factual programme. The company also produced a short film for BBC Comic Relief in 2009 which was written by Richard Curtis and voiced by Martin Freeman. Using a mixture of 2D and 3D effects, the film highlighted the problem of Malaria in developing countries.

In 2012, the animation studio released their second stop motion film Macropolis; a story of two toys with impairments who are discarded from a factory production line. Since its release, the film has won over 14 international awards, including Best Animated Short at the 4th Irish Film & Television Awards. In the same year, Flickerpix designed their first app called Macrophonics which was based on Macropolis.

Flickerpix developed the television series Five Fables which retells five medieval Scottish stories written by Scots poet Robert Henryson approximately 500 years ago. The fables were translated by Irish poet-playwright Seamus Heaney and Flickerpix adapted them into a five-part series for BBC Two Northern Ireland, directed by Dean Burke, which premiered on Thursday 13 March 2014. The fables included in the series are ‘The Two Mice’, 'The Mouse and the Lion’, ‘The Fox, the Wolf and the Carter’, ‘The Preaching of the Swallow’ and ‘The Fox, the Wolf and the Farmer’. The series was narrated by critically acclaimed actor Billy Connolly. Following this, the studio designed their second app Seamus Heaney: Five Fables in collaboration with Touchpress. The features of the app include insights from leading academics and an interface that allows you to move between Heaney and Henryson’s text, as well as being able to watch the animated series. In 2014, the app was awarded 'Best App' at the Celtic Media Festival.

In 2014, Flickerpix designed their first game app Boogie Woogie which is a rhythm, dance and memory game built for iOS and Android platform and was programmed by Billy Goat Entertainment.

In 2015, Flickerpix collaborated with JAM Media and Double Z Enterprises to produce the animated TV series Zig and Zag, which currently airs on RTÉjr and CBBC. Creators and writers, Ciaran Morrison and Mick O'Hara, reprise the original voices of the beloved puppets.

Services 
Flickerpix provides a range of animation services including stop motion, 2D animation, 3D animation and motion graphics. Their clients vary from television broadcasting companies, such as Channel 4 and BBC, to  advertising agencies.

Filmography

Short films

Television series 
Released Series

Current Series

Games

Apps

References

External links
Flickerpix website
Macropolis Upcoming film for London 2012 Cultural Olympiad.

Irish animation studios
Companies of Northern Ireland
2012 Cultural Olympiad